Tiaan de Klerk (born 12 June 2001) is a Namibian rugby union player for the Mogliano in the Italian Top10. His regular position is lock. 

De Klerk was named in the  squad for the 2021 Currie Cup Premier Division.

References

South African rugby union players
2001 births
Living people
Rugby union locks
Blue Bulls players